Brad O'Neill (born 22 July 2002) is an English professional rugby league footballer who plays as a  for the Wigan Warriors in the Betfred Super League.

Playing career
In 2021 he made his Super League début for Wigan against Wakefield Trinity.
On 28 May 2022, he played for Wigan in their 2022 Challenge Cup Final victory over Huddersfield.

References

External links
Wigan Warriors profile
In focus: Brad O’Neill

2002 births
Living people
English rugby league players
Newcastle Thunder players
Rugby league hookers
Rugby league players from Leigh, Greater Manchester
Widnes Vikings players
Wigan Warriors players